"Certified" is a song by American rapper Glasses Malone, released as the first single from his third studio album, Beach Cruiser. The track is produced by DJ Toomp and features Akon.

West coast artists such as Jay Rock, E-40, and Mack 10 make cameos in the music video. The music video premiered on BET's 106 & Park on March 4, 2008.

The remix features Bun B, Kam and Lil Wayne.

Another remix by artists signed to Malone's record label Blu Division featuring Conflict, Quiz, The Bloc Boyz, K-Style, Roc Slanga and Akon.

The official remix featuring Bun B, Kam, Lil Wayne, Akon and a new verse by Glasses Malone can be found on Bun B's 2008 album II Trill. It was also released by Glasses Malone as a single.

Charts

References

2007 songs
Glasses Malone songs
Akon songs
Gangsta rap songs
2007 debut singles
Cash Money Records singles
Universal Motown Records singles
Song recordings produced by DJ Toomp
Songs written by Akon